The 1970–71 season was Manchester United's 69th season in the Football League, and their 26th consecutive season in the top division of English football. In a pre-season competition United participated in the Watney Cup, which was contested by the teams that had scored the most goals in each of the four divisions of the Football League the previous season who had not been promoted or admitted to one of the European competitions.

On 29 December 1970, United manager Wilf McGuinness who struggled in his new post was replaced with Matt Busby who returned as United manager until the end of the season, guiding the club to an eighth-place finish in the league. Following speculation that the Celtic manager Jock Stein would take over during the close season of 1971, Leicester City manager Frank O'Farrell was given the United job.

United's best chance of success came in the League Cup, but they were beaten by Third Division side Aston Villa in the semi-finals.

Watney Cup

First Division

FA Cup

League Cup

Squad statistics

Notes

References

Manchester United F.C. seasons
Manchester United